Majkowski (feminine: Majkowska, plural: Majkowscy) is a Polish surname. Notable people with the surname include:

 Aleksander Majkowski (1876–1938), Kashubian writer, poet, journalist, editor, activist, and physician
 Don Majkowski (born 1964), American football player
 Justyna Majkowska (born 1977), Polish singer
 Kamil Majkowski (born 1989), Polish footballer
 Maria Ilnicka, maiden name Majkowska (1825 or 1827–1897), Polish poet, novelist, translator and journalist

See also
 Małkowski (surname)
 Blake Mycoskie (born 1976), American entrepreneur, author, founder of Toms Shoes

Polish-language surnames